Klaus Thunemann (born 19 April 1937) is a German bassoonist, considered "one of the finest bassoonists of his generation".

Biography 
Klaus Thunemann was born in Magdeburg on 19 April 1937. He originally studied piano but from the age of 18 focused on the bassoon. He was a student at the Hochschule für Musik in Berlin, where he studied under Willy Fugmann. Upon graduation Thunemann was engaged by the North German Radio Symphony Orchestra of Hamburg where he served as principal bassoonist from 1962 to 1978. During this time he also appeared frequently in chamber music and as a soloist. In the 1970s he also collaborated with jazz players and free improvisers such as Eberhard Weber.

Thunemann has an extensive discography, recording the bassoon repertoire of Vivaldi, Mozart and others for labels including Philips Records and Deutsche Grammophon. On his recordings, he has collaborated with many artists including pianist Alfred Brendel, oboist Heinz Holliger, and the chamber group I Musici.

From 1978, he focused on a teaching career in addition to his solo work. Thunemann served on the faculties of the Hochschule für Musik, Theater und Medien Hannover, the Hochschule für Musik Hanns Eisler Berlin, Madrid's International Institute of Chamber Music and the Reina Sofía School of Music in Madrid.

Upon his retirement from teaching in Germany, the German government honored Thunemann in 2006 with the Order of Merit of the Federal Republic of Germany (the Federal Cross of Merit). Thunemann has continued to perform occasionally as a bassoon soloist. In October 2008, he appeared at the Jerusalem International Chamber Music Festival playing the Bassoon Sonata by Saint-Saëns.

References

External links

German classical bassoonists
1937 births
Living people
Recipients of the Cross of the Order of Merit of the Federal Republic of Germany
Academic staff of the Reina Sofía School of Music
Academic staff of the Hochschule für Musik Hanns Eisler Berlin
Musicians from Magdeburg